SS Titan may refer to:

 SS Titan, the fictional title ship in the 1898 novella Futility, or the Wreck of the Titan, which presented a scenario similar to the real-life sinking of  some 14 years later
 , a Type C2-S-B1 ship; later renamed American Packer; scrapped in 1970
 , a tugboat and tender operated by the French Line from 1894 until her scrapping in 1957

References 

Ship names